"Feels Like Heaven" is a song by British dance band Urban Cookie Collective, released on 1 November 1993 as the second single from their debut album, High on a Happy Vibe (1994). As the follow-up to "The Key The Secret", it peaked at number five on the UK Singles Chart, staying in the chart for nine consecutive weeks. The vocals were by Diane Charlemagne, who had provided the vocal for the band's previous hit and their subsequent singles. Its accompanying music video was directed by Lindy Heymann.

Critical reception
Andy Beevers from Music Week gave "Feels Like Heaven" five out of five. He wrote, "The follow-up to "The Key The Secret" unsurprisingly sticks to pretty much the same infectious upbeat house formula. It should not have much trouble following its predecessor into the Top 40, although it may not reach the same dizzy heights." The RM Dance Update described it as a "bright and catchy sequel". Alex Kadis from Smash Hits rated the song two out of five, viewing it as "a sure-fire hit to follow their No 2 triumph". She also noted its "uplifting vocals and prerequisite soaring backbeat". Another editor, Mark Frith, complimented it as a "corking" single.

Chart performance
"Feels Like Heaven" proved to be quite successful on the charts in Europe, Canada and Australia. In Europe, it made its way into the top 10 in Belgium, Ireland, the Netherlands, Switzerland and the United Kingdom, as well as on MTV's European Top 20, where it reached number three. In the UK, the single peaked at number five in its second week at the UK Singles Chart, on 14 November 1993, and spent nine weeks on the chart. On the UK Dance Singles Chart, it was even more successful, reaching number three. Additionally, it was a top-20 hit in Austria, Denmark, Finland, Germany and Sweden, as well as on the Eurochart Hot 100, where it reached number 17. But on the European Dance Radio Chart, it rose to number one. Outside Europe, "Feels Like Heaven" went to number four on the RPM Dance/Urban chart in Canada, number ten in Australia and number 47 in New Zealand.

Music video
A music video was made for "Feels Like Heaven", directed by British director Lindy Heymann. It sees the band performing the song on a beach. Heymann had previously directed the video for the band's first hit, "The Key the Secret", and would also be directing their next video for "Sail Away".

Track listing

Charts

Weekly charts

Year-end charts

Certifications

References

1993 singles
1993 songs
Music videos directed by Lindy Heymann
Pulse 8 singles
Urban Cookie Collective songs